Highlight Towers is a twin tower office skyscraper complex completed in 2004 in Munich, Germany, planned by architects Murphy/Jahn of Chicago. The towers are joined by two skyways made of glass and steel. Also in the complex are two low-rise buildings  between the twin towers, that serve as a hotel and additional office space.

The towers are slightly shifted in the historic sightline of Odeonsplatz on Ludwigstraße with Victory Gate to the north and form a focal point for visitors coming from the north of the city.

Tenants
The best known tenants of the buildings are the IT and consulting firms Unify and Fujitsu Technology Solutions, as well as IBM.

Controversy
With construction works finished in the same year as Hochhaus Uptown München, the two towers helped motivate the formation of a citizens' initiative aimed at preventing the development of further structures of this type and size. Leading architects criticized the buildings as "imported imitation architecture" and "faceless yard ware", while local residents expressed concerns related to the skyscrapers destroying the traditional cityscape.

Gallery

References

External links 

 Highlight Towers official website

Skyscrapers in Munich
Twin towers
Tourist attractions in Munich
Skyscraper office buildings in Germany
Helmut Jahn buildings
Office buildings completed in 2004